Hastimima is a genus of prehistoric eurypterid of the family Mycteroptidae. It contains one valid species, Hastimima whitei, recovered from the Permian Hermit Shale of Arizona, and one dubious species, H. sewardi, from the Devonian of South Africa. Though clearly a mycteropoid eurypterid, the material referred to H. sewardi is so fragmentary that it is questionable if it possesses any diagnostic value at all.

See also 
 List of eurypterid genera

References 

Stylonurina
Permian arthropods
Eurypterids of North America
Permian United States
Fossil taxa described in 1908
Permian eurypterids